Linthal may refer to:

 Linthal, Glarus, a settlement in the upper valley of the Linth river, in the canton of Glarus in Switzerland
 Linthal, Haut-Rhin, a commune in the  Haut-Rhin department in Alsace in north-eastern France
 The valley of the Linth river, in the canton of Glarus in Switzerland